Podosinovets is the name of several inhabited localities in Russia.

Urban localities
Podosinovets, Kirov Oblast, an urban-type settlement in Podosinovsky District of Kirov Oblast

Rural localities
Podosinovets, Vologda Oblast, a settlement in Osinovsky Selsoviet of Nikolsky District of Vologda Oblast